Upendra Prasad is an Indian politician. He was elected to the Bihar Legislative Council as member an Elected by Legislative Assembly from Janata Dal (United). He later joined Hindustani Awam Morcha.

References

Living people
Members of the Bihar Legislative Council
Janata Dal (United) politicians
Hindustani Awam Morcha politicians
People from Aurangabad district, Bihar
Year of birth missing (living people)